The Ambassador of Japan to the Philippines is the head of the Japanese diplomatic mission in the Philippines and the official representative of the government of Japan to the government of the Philippines. The diplomatic relations between the Philippines and Japan began in 1888 when a Japanese consulate was established in Manila and in 1943, it elevated into an embassy, right after the inauguration of the Second Philippine Republic. The relations were suspended in 1945, after the surrender of Japan to the Allied forces and it remained dormant until 1952 when the Japanese government sent its minister to Manila. On July 23, 1956, the rank of ambassador was reestablished after the ratification of the Peace Treaty and Reparations Agreement between the Philippines and Japan.

The embassy of Japan in the Philippines is based in Pasay City, Metro Manila. The position has the rank of Ambassador extraordinary and plenipotentiary.

List of ambassadors

Consuls and consul generals during the Spanish and American colonial periods

Ambassadors

See also
Embassy of the Philippines, Tokyo
List of ambassadors of the Philippines to Japan
Japan–Philippines relations
Foreign relations of the Philippines
Foreign relations of Japan

References

External links
Website of the Japanese Embassy, Manila

Philippines
 
Japan